Barton Holland Warnock (1911–1998) was an American botanist and leading authority on flora of the Trans-Pecos area and northern Chihuahua Desert.

Biography
Born in Christoval, Texas in July 1911, Warnock grew up at Fort Stockton, Texas and by 1937 graduated from Sul Ross State University (then Sul Ross State College) in Alpine, Texas. He received a master's degree from the University of Iowa and a Ph.D. from the University of Texas in Austin.

In 1946 Warnock joined the faculty of Sul Ross State College and a year later was named biology department chair. He worked there for more than 50 years until retirement, during which he continued collecting various plant species in the region. He wrote three books from 1970 to 1977 and was working on a fourth volume.

Warnock died from a heart attack at the age of 86 on June 9, 1998 while driving a car near Alpine.  After his death the Sul Ross science building was named after him. The Barton Warnock Environmental Education Visitor Center, a state park near Lajitas in Presidio County, Texas, also bears his name and houses his extensive collection of plant specimens.  An endemic genus of plants Lamiaceae (Warnockia) is named in his honor as well.

Publications

References

1911 births
1998 deaths
20th-century American botanists
University of Texas alumni
Sul Ross State University alumni
Sul Ross State University faculty